Czarna  (until 30 December 1999: Czarna Górna, Chorna) is a village in Bieszczady County, Subcarpathian Voivodeship, in south-eastern Poland, close to the border with Ukraine. It is the seat of the gmina (administrative district) called Gmina Czarna.

The village has a population of 1,300.

References

Villages in Bieszczady County